Otto Bernhardt (13 February 1942 in Rendsburg - 8 October 2021) was a German politician of the CDU. Bernhardt had been a member of the Bundestag from 1998 until 2009.

References

External links 
 Official Website 

1942 births
2021 deaths
People from Rendsburg
Members of the Bundestag for Schleswig-Holstein
Officers Crosses of the Order of Merit of the Federal Republic of Germany
Members of the Landtag of Schleswig-Holstein
Members of the Bundestag 2005–2009
Members of the Bundestag 2002–2005
Members of the Bundestag 1998–2002
Members of the Bundestag for the Christian Democratic Union of Germany